Edward Clark Timothy McKeever  (August 25, 1910 – September 13, 1974) was an American football player, coach, and executive. He served as the head football coach at the University of Notre Dame (1944) and Cornell University (1945–1946) and the University of San Francisco (1947), compiling a career college football record of 25–12–1.  From 1960 to 1961, McKeever was the general manager of the American Football League's Boston Patriots

A native of Texas, McKeever originally attended Notre Dame in 1930 and 1931 and transferred to Texas Tech University, where he played football from 1932 to 1934.  He launched his coaching career in 1935 as backfield coach at Texas Tech, where he remained through 1938.  In 1939 and 1940, McKeever was on Frank Leahy's staff at Boston College.  He came to Notre Dame along with Leahy in 1941 and served as an assistant through 1943, and was named interim head coach in 1944 when Leahy entered the United States Navy.  McKeever gained a spot in the Notre Dame record books by presiding over the worst defeat in school history, a 59–0 rout by Army.  in 1945, McKeever moved on to Cornell as head coach, where he remained for two seasons.  In 1947, he became head coach at the University of San Francisco and the following season served as head coach of the Chicago Rockets of the All-America Football Conference.  In 1949, he joined the staff at Louisiana State University and in 1960 became general manager of the Boston Patriots.

McKeever died on September 13, 1974.

Head coaching record

College

References

External links
 Edward McKeever at Pro-Football-Reference.com

1910 births
1974 deaths
Boston College Eagles football coaches
Chicago Rockets coaches
Cornell Big Red football coaches
LSU Tigers football coaches
New England Patriots executives
Notre Dame Fighting Irish football coaches
San Francisco Dons football coaches
Texas Tech Red Raiders football coaches
Texas Tech Red Raiders football players
National Football League general managers
University of Notre Dame alumni
Sportspeople from San Antonio
Players of American football from San Antonio
United States Navy personnel of World War II